William Moreland may refer to:

 Bunk Moreland, a fictional character in the TV series The Wire
 William Hall Moreland (1861–1946), bishop of the Missionary District of Sacramento
 William Harrison Moreland, British civil servant
 SS William C Moreland, a Great Lakes freighter